Bruna Lirio (born September 11, 1994) is a Brazilian model, best known for her work as a Victoria's Secret model.

Career 
Bruna was recruited in 2013 in her hometown of Vitoria, Brazil and signed with Mc2 Models Miami. She later signed with Wilhelmina Models New York. Bruna Lirio has appeared in the Victoria's Secret Fashion Show twice, in, 2015 & 2017. 

Lirio has walked for many fashion brands & high fashion designers, including Area, John Paul Ataker, Lela Rose, Jenny Packham, Christian Siriano, Cushnie et Ochs, Tadashi Shoji and more.

She has appeared in an editorial for Harper's Bazaar Bulgaria
shot by Stefan Imielski.

References

1994 births
Brazilian female models
Living people